is a Japanese essayist and wife of Naoto Kan, who was the Prime Minister of Japan from June 2010  September 2011.

Biography 
Kan was born Nobuko Himei on October 3, 1945, in Konkō, Okayama. Her father and grandfather were doctors and her mother was on the city council. Kan studied at Tsuda University, where she met Naoto Kan. She went on to study at Waseda University so that she could stay in Tokyo with Naoto, and graduated in 1970. They married that winter. However, because they are first cousins, the engagement was met with parental opposition.

Kan campaigned for Naoto while raising their sons, Gentaro and Shinjiro. She would go door to door to talk to people and answer questions for housewives. She also made speeches and has been described by the Irish Times as 'a formidable campaign speaker'.

When magazines spread rumors of Naoto having an affair with a television announcer, Kan famously scolded him for letting his guard down, the brushed the incident off.

During Naoto's time as the Prime Minister of Japan, did not want to be called the First Lady, saying that she is simply Naoto's wife. Kan also gained a reputation as a scold when she wrote a book that was surprisingly critical of her husband, talking not only about the occasionally lackluster delivery of his speeches, but also about his inability to cook and lack of fashion sense. Its English title was "What on Earth Will Change in Japan After You Become Prime Minister?". Naoto has called her his toughest critic, and said that he has not read the book. The two regularly debate about politics and have opposing viewpoints on controversial issues like the death penalty.

Some of the things that Naoto had done during his career were at Kan's urging, such as publicly apologizing after the government had distributed blood that was contaminated with AIDS.

Selected bibliography

References 

1945 births
People from Okayama Prefecture
Japanese essayists
Living people
Spouses of prime ministers of Japan
Tsuda University alumni
Waseda University alumni